Gara Garayev is a Baku Metro station.  It was opened on 6 November 1972. It was previously called Avrora during the Soviet Era and is now named after Gara Garayev.

See also
List of Baku metro stations

References

Baku Metro stations
Railway stations opened in 1972
1972 establishments in Azerbaijan